Pennsylvania's 12th congressional district is located in southwestern Pennsylvania, including Pittsburgh and much of Allegheny County, as well as some of Westmoreland County. It has been represented since January 3, 2023 by Summer Lee.

Before 2018, the 12th district was located in southwestern Pennsylvania and included all of Beaver County, and parts of Allegheny, Cambria, Lawrence, Somerset, and Westmoreland Counties. The Supreme Court of Pennsylvania redrew this and other state congressional districts in February 2018 after ruling the previous map unconstitutional due to partisan gerrymandering. The new 12th district covers much of the old 10th district. The old 12th district was redrawn to an area north and west of Pittsburgh and renamed the 17th district for the 2018 elections and representation after that.

Before the 2011 round of redistricting, the 12th district was widely considered to be gerrymandered by the Republican-controlled state legislature as a heavily Democratic district. It consisted of all of Greene County, and parts of Allegheny, Armstrong, Cambria, Fayette, Indiana, Somerset, Washington, and Westmoreland Counties.

Geography 2003–2013

Located in southwestern Pennsylvania, the 12th district consisted of all of Greene County, and parts of Allegheny, Armstrong, Cambria, Fayette, Indiana, Somerset, Washington, and Westmoreland Counties. A thoroughly unionized district, the 12th was historically among the most Democratic areas of the state. However, the Democrats in this area were not as liberal as their counterparts in Philadelphia and Pittsburgh. Most were somewhat conservative on social issues, particularly abortion and gun control.

The 12th included all of Greene County, a highly rural region that still has a traditionally Democratic influence due to its labor leanings. In Washington county, the city of Washington and eastern portions of the county, a large and Democratic edge suburb of Pittsburgh, was a part of the 12th. Most of the Monongahela Valley region, a very Democratic area once an important steel-making area, was also part of the 12th. However, more rural western Washington County and the suburban northern portion of the county (with towns like McDonald and Canonsburg) then belonged to the 18th. The western portion of Fayette County, including the city of Uniontown, a labor Democratic stronghold, was part of this district. In contrast, the rural mountainous eastern portion was a part of the 9th.

The 12th district continued eastward, including southeastern and northeastern parts of Westmoreland County, including the labor Democratic city of Latrobe, while leaving the suburban western part of the county (with towns such as Murrysville) and the generally left-leaning city of Greensburg in the 18th. The major population base of the district was located just to the east, taking in most of Somerset and Cambria counties. This area, the heart of a sizeable coal-mining region, includes the district's largest city, Johnstown. The 12th also contained a part of Indiana County, mainly the college town of Indiana.

The 12th completed its wrap around the metro Pittsburgh region by ending in the northeastern corner of the city's suburbs, containing middle class regions such as Lower Burrell and the working-class suburb of New Kensington. A portion of Armstrong County was also included in the district, including several industrial suburbs such as Freeport and Apollo.

Demographics

History
After the 2000 census, the Republican-controlled state legislature radically altered the 12th to get more Republicans elected from traditionally heavily Democratic southwestern Pennsylvania. A large chunk of the old 20th district was incorporated into the 12th. In some parts of the western portion of the district, one side of the street is in the 12th, while the other is in the 18th district (the reconfigured 20th). This led to criticism that the 12th was a gerrymander intended to pack as many of southwestern Pennsylvania's heavily Democratic areas as possible into just two districts—the 12th and the Pittsburgh-based .

Before the 2012 redistricting, the district has a Cook Partisan Voting Index score of R+1. The district is notable as the only congressional district in the nation that voted for Democratic presidential candidate John Kerry in 2004 but went for Republican John McCain in 2008. This is mainly because, since 2000, southwestern Pennsylvania has gradually become more Republican.

2006 election
In the 2006 election, Murtha was re-elected with 61% of the vote. His Republican opponent, Washington County Commissioner Diana Irey, received 39%.

2008 election
John Murtha won the 2008 election with 58% of the vote. Murtha was a United States Marine and the first Vietnam War veteran to serve in Congress. He defeated Lt. Col. William T. Russell, an army veteran.

2010 special election

Pennsylvania governor Ed Rendell scheduled a special election for May 18, 2010, following the death of Representative John Murtha. On March 8, 2010, the Pennsylvania Democratic Party's Executive Committee nominated Mark Critz, Murtha's former district director. On March 11, a convention of Republicans from the 12th district nominated businessman Tim Burns. The Libertarian Party's candidate was Demo Agoris, who ran for the Pennsylvania House of Representatives in the 48th district as a Libertarian in 2006.

Mark Critz won the election.

2010 election
Mark Critz was re-elected in the regularly scheduled 2010 election, again beating Republican Tim Burns (this time with 51% of the vote against 49%).

2012 election
Mark Critz ran for re-election to a second full term in the 2012 election but was defeated by Republican challenger Keith Rothfus. Critz garnered 48.5% of the vote to Rothfus' 51.5%. The 12th had absorbed a large chunk of the old 4th district, including Rothfus' home, after the 2010 census, and was significantly more Republican than its predecessor.

2019 special election

After Tom Marino's resignation in January 2019, an election was held on May 21 to fill the open seat. Republican Fred Keller defeated 2018 Democratic nominee Mark Friedenberg.

List of members representing the district

Recent election results

2012

2014

2016

2018

2019 special election

2020

2022

See also
List of United States congressional districts
Pennsylvania's congressional districts

References

Further reading
 
 
 Congressional Biographical Directory of the United States 1774–present
 Congressman Tom Marino resigns, leaving a vacancy in Pa.'s 12th district

External links
 Congressional redistricting in Pennsylvania

12
Constituencies established in 1795
1795 establishments in Pennsylvania
Constituencies disestablished in 1803
1803 disestablishments in Pennsylvania
Constituencies established in 1813
1813 establishments in Pennsylvania